Egi Kazuyuki (May 21, 1853 – August 23, 1932) was a Japanese politician who served as governor of Hiroshima Prefecture in 1898–1903. He was born in Yamaguchi Prefecture. He was also governor of Ibaraki Prefecture (1896–1897), Tochigi Prefecture (1897), Aichi Prefecture (1897–1898) and Kumamoto Prefecture (1903–1907). He was a recipient of the Order of the Rising Sun (4th class, 1896; 2nd class, 1902; 1st class, 1906) and the Order of the Sacred Treasure (4th class, 1895; 3rd class, 1899) as well as being a member of the French Legion of Honour (joined 1901).

1853 births
1932 deaths
Japanese Home Ministry government officials
Governors of Ibaraki Prefecture
Governors of Tochigi Prefecture
Governors of Aichi Prefecture
Governors of Hiroshima
Governors of Kumamoto Prefecture
Recipients of the Order of the Rising Sun with Paulownia Flowers
Grand Cordons of the Order of the Rising Sun
Recipients of the Order of the Rising Sun, 2nd class
Recipients of the Order of the Sacred Treasure, 3rd class
Recipients of the Order of the Rising Sun, 4th class
Recipients of the Order of the Sacred Treasure, 4th class
Commandeurs of the Légion d'honneur
Politicians from Yamaguchi Prefecture